George Rees (birth unknown – death unknown) was a Welsh rugby union and professional rugby league footballer who played in the 1910s and 1920s. George Rees was a bombardier during World War I.

Rees was the younger brother of the rugby union footballers for Ammanford RFC; David Rees, Bill Rees and Tom Rees. Rees was the captain of the Ammanford RFC 1912–1914 "Invincibles", who did not concede a try for three seasons.

Rees made his début for Leeds on Saturday 5 September 1914, he played right-, i.e. number 10, in Leeds' 2-35 defeat by Huddersfield in the Championship Final during the 1914–15 season. Rees was selected for Great Britain (RL) while at Leeds for the 1920 Great Britain Lions tour of Australia and New Zealand, although he did not play in any of the Test matches on this tour.

References

External links
The Invincibles 1912-1914
James Goldthorpe's Notebook Leeds results and scorers - 1914-15
The Ammanford Valley Chronicle And East Carmarthen News - 13 December 1917

Ammanford RFC players
British Army personnel of World War I
Footballers who switched code
Great Britain national rugby league team players
Leeds Rhinos players
Neath RFC players
Place of birth missing
Place of death missing
Royal Artillery soldiers
Rugby league props
Rugby union three-quarters
Welsh rugby league players
Welsh rugby union players
Year of birth missing
Year of death missing